The 2013 Campeonato Potiguar de Futebol was the 93rd edition of the Rio Grande do Norte's top professional football league. The competition began on January 13, and ended on May 19. Potiguar de Mossoró won the championship by the 2nd time, while Potyguar de Currais Novos was relegated.

Format
On the first stage, all teams excluding those who aren't playing on Copa do Nordeste play against each other team twice. The best six teams qualify to the next stage, and the worst team is relegated.

On the second teams, the six teams from the first stage are joined by América and ABC. The eight teams play against all other in each round. The four best teams in each round advance to the round's final. Each round winner advance to the championship's final. If the same team win both rounds, that team is the championship winner.

Qualifications
The best team who isn't on Campeonato Brasileiro Série A, Série B or Série C qualifies to the 2013 Campeonato Brasileiro Série D. The best three teams qualify to the 2014 Copa do Brasil. The best team in the first stage qualifies to the 2013 Copa do Brasil.

Participating teams

First stage

Standings

Results

Second stage
The six teams from the first stage are joined by ABC and América-RN.

First round (Copa Rio Grande do Norte)

Standings

Results

Finals

América Futebol Clube is the champion of the first round and qualifies to the final.

Second round (Copa Cidade de Natal)

Standings

Results

Finals

Associação Cultural e Desportiva Potiguar is the champion of the second round and qualifies to the final.

Final stage

Associação Cultural e Desportiva Potiguar  won the 2013 Campeonato Potiguar.

References

Potiguar
2013